The Keetoowah Nighthawk Society was a Cherokee organisation formed ca. 1900 that intended to preserve and practice traditional "old ways" of tribal life, based on religious nationalism. It was led by Redbird Smith, a Cherokee National Council and original Keetoowah Society member. It formed in the Indian Territory that was superseded by admission of Oklahoma as a state, during the late-nineteenth century period when the federal government was breaking up tribal governments and communal lands under the Dawes Act and Curtis Act. The Nighthawks arose in response to weakening resolve on the part of Cherokee leaders—including the original Keetoowah Society (Cherokee: ᎩᏚᏩ ᎤᎾᏙᏢᎯ), a political organization created by Cherokee Native American full bloods, in or about 1859—to continue their resistance on behalf of the Cherokee after the Dawes Commission began forcing the transfer of Oklahoma tribal lands in the Indian Territory to individual ownership in the 1890s (a process termed allotment). 

Soon after forming, the Keetoowah Nighthawk Society grew to as many as 5,500 members, but they could not forestall the changes made by the Dawes Commission. In 1900 its representatives came to an allotment agreement with Cherokee leaders. After doing so, the Commission enrolled the generally non-compliant Nighthawks in the tribe without obtaining their consents, and registered them for allotments. In 1902, arrested Redbird Smith was arrested and also compelled to enroll for allotment. 

The Nighthawks would not acknowledge these forced commitments, and as other Cherokee become citizens of Oklahoma (statehood, November 16, 1907), the traditionalists, believing that "acculturation represented the greatest threat to [their] people," fled to hilly areas near Blackgum Mountain (in present-day Sequoyah County, Oklahoma). There, on the strength of their commitment and numbers—and using the record of Cherokee and Keetoowah history of a sacred wampum belt that they had located—the remaining Nighthawks "strove to preserve the ancient Cherokee culture;" in 1908 they elected Smith as chief for life. But, as Michael Lee Weber notes, "his movement had already declined," and by the end of 1918, "Redbird Smith, 'the moving spirit'" of their society, had died.

Hence, the Keetoowah Nighthawk Society became, alongside the original Keetoowah Society, a spiritual core of the Cherokee people during the years of the early 1900s, in the Indian Territory that would eventually become a part of Oklahoma.

Etymology 

The word "Keetoowah" is the name of an ancient Cherokee Township in the Eastern Homeland of the Cherokee, where all Cherokee originated after the migration and integration of various groups from the Great Lakes and Ozark Plateau Regions of the United States 3,000 years ago, based upon cultural and archaeological evidence.  There is also evidence in the modern culture to suggest that the ancient Keetoowah developed an ancient hereditary priesthood called the Ah-ni-ku-ta-ni, who were a religious ruling class of the Keetoowah people and Cherokee Society for thousands of years.

According to Cherokee legend, when the population grew too large to sustain the Mother city, groups moved to new areas and created new Cherokee Communities and Mound Cities.  The residents of the city of Keetoowah called themselves "the Keetoowah People".  The ancient site of the Mother City of Keetoowah is still visible in Western North Carolina in the same general area as the Qualla Boundary. Keetoowah was an ancient "Mound" city and the central earthwork mound is still visible at the ancient townsite.  Moundbuilding was not confined to the Cherokee, but was a common construction method of various Mississippian cultures and earlier peoples for thousands of years throughout the Mississippi Basin.

Some Cherokee traditionalists refer to themselves as Ah-ni-ki-tu-wa-gi (spelled variously in local Oklahoma dialects as Ki-tu-wa or Gi-du-wa), Keetoowah People.   The addition of the verb stem modifier "gi" indicates the word Ki-tu'-wa-gi means, "a gathering or putting together of the Ki-tu'-wa people", since "gi" means "to combine" in the Cherokee Language.  Most modern Cherokee speakers can no longer translate the word "Ki-tu-wa," as the meaning of the word has been lost. Ki-tu-wa means "the mother city" or "the center (spiritual center)" in the ancient Ah-ni-ku-ta-ni dialect.  The word Ki-tu'-wa-gi, implies a religious or social gathering of the people.  Honoring the mother city was analogous to honoring Selu, the Cherokee Corn Mother of the ancient Green Corn Ceremony, a concept that pervades Cherokee culture.

During the Green Corn Ceremony as practiced by the Cherokee, one of the two social dances performed is of ancient origin, and originated from the mother city of Keetoowah.  The dance is called ye-lu-le which means "to the center".  During this dance, all of the dancers shout ye-lu-le and move towards the fire in the center of the sacred dance circle . The dance symbolizes the dispersal of the sacred fire given to the Keetoowah people by the Creator and the Thunder Beings in their ancient legends.  During traditional Green Corn ceremonies, the Cherokee carried the coals of the central fire in Keetoowah to all the Cherokee communities; the coals were used to kindle the ceremonial fires for the dances in each Cherokee City or township.  The home fires in outlying Cherokee communities were extinguished before the ceremonies and re-lit from the coals of the fire kindled during the Green Corn dances.

History 

The Cherokee Nation was divided by the Dawes Commission in the 1890s.  The Dawes commission was tasked to force assimilation and breakup of tribal governments within Oklahoma by instilling the concept of land ownership among individual households of the Five Civilized Tribes.  The commission divided large sections of land into household allotments to eliminate the traditional governments of the Cherokee and other tribes, which were based on communal holding of land. As a consequence of the Dawes Commission programs, the Cherokee culture and society was destabilized and strictly controlled.  The federal government appointed chiefs of the tribe, who were reduced to administrators and carried out government programs intended to force assimilation of the Cherokee.

As part of assimilation, during the late 19th and early 20th centuries, the government sponsored Indian boarding schools, where Cherokee and other Native American children attended away from their families.  They were prohibited from speaking their own languages or practicing their own religions and cultures. Over time, much of the Cherokee culture was lost. The remaining Cherokee during this period in history begin to adopt and integrate cultural practices of other tribes who were being forcibly removed into Oklahoma Territory.

Redbird Smith

To resist the cultural erosion, Redbird Smith and other Cherokee leaders and elders formed a secret society, the Keetoowah Nighthawk Society, where they secretly practiced the traditional ceremonies and gatherings.  This group aimed to preserve much of the pre-removal culture, ceremonies, and beliefs of the Cherokee.

Redbird Smith was an influential Nighthawk member who revitalized traditional spirituality among Cherokees, beginning in the late 19th century. He was born July 19, 1850, near the city of Fort Smith, Arkansas to parents traveling with other Cherokee to the Indian Territory from Georgia. His father, Pig Redbird Smith, was a devoted supporter of the Long House's group of eastern Indians' ancient rituals, customs and practices.  His mother, Lizzie Hildebrand Smith, was from a prominent Cherokee family. During Redbird's childhood, his father committed him to the service of the Cherokee people in harmony with the ancient customs, and eventually he became chairman of the council.

In 1889 the Redbird Movement began, splitting from Keetoowah to create Keetoowah Nighthawk, a renewed and modernized Keetoowah Society that was more political, holding meetings at the ceremonial areas known as gatiyo (stomp grounds). Descendants of the late chief John Ross reintroduced Cherokee wampum belts to the Keetoowah. Although the Keetoowah Nighthawks were unsuccessful in forestalling the allotment of communal lands, they strongly opposed the program of allotment of the Cherokee tribal lands that the government had agreed to do, with much passion.

In 1908, the Keetoowah Nighthawk Council held an election.  As a result, Redbird Smith was chosen as chief and was known as the leader of the Keetoowah Nighthawk Society. Redbird Smith, great-grandfather of former Cherokee Nation Principal Chief Chadwick "Corntassel" Smith, stated in the early 1900s:

His goal was to retain all that was lost from the Keetoowah.  He was eventually jailed, along with some followers, for resistance to the land allotment and registration of tribal members. Smith died in 1918, along with the Redbird Movement.

In modern times

The Keetoowah Nighthawk Society has been revived by the Cherokee in Oklahoma. In Redbird Smith's time, there were more than 20 Cherokee Stomp Grounds; the seven ceremonial dance grounds in Oklahoma today belong either to the Keetoowah tradition or the Four Mothers Society.

The society is fractured and is not affiliated with any particular Cherokee Nation, Band, or Tribe.  Members of the fragments of the original society are affiliated with many Cherokee communities in Oklahoma.  Some of the modern groups claiming to represent the original Keetoowah culture have integrated Christianity and various new age beliefs into their religious practices.

In popular culture and media
The KJRH-TV documentary, Spirit of the Fire (1984) documented the history of the Keetoowah Nighthawk Society,  recounting their preservation of traditional ceremonies and rituals practiced and by the early Oklahoma Cherokee people.

See also

 Cherokee removal
 Trail of Tears
 The Trail of Tears: Cherokee Legacy (film, 2006) 
 Redbird Smith
 Original Keetoowah Society
 Cherokee
 Cherokee Nation

References and notes

Further reading 

  Text from renowned Native American writer R.J. Conley, accompanying D. Fitzgerald's photographic work. 
   Book length work (324 pages), appearing to be the dissertation work of University of Oklahoma anthropology doctoral student D.J. Myers.

External links
 Spirit of the Fire Video
 Red Bird Smith and the Keetoowah Society." Access Genealogy, Web. 21 Oct. 2011.

Cherokee Nation (1794–1907)
Native American rights organizations
Native American religion